LaLa DX is a Japanese shōjo manga magazine published by Hakusensha. It was first published on July 9, 1983 as a supplement magazine to LaLa in which it later became the sister magazine to LaLa, another of Hakusensha's shōjo manga magazines. The magazine was originally published as a quarterly, but now is released bi-monthly on the tenth of even-numbered months.

Current serializing titles

4 Jigen - Kana Niza
Natsume Yūjinchō - Yuki Midorikawa
Prince Freya - Keiko Ishihara
Vampire Knight: Memories - Matsuri Hino

Past serializing titles

0-9
3 Hearts - Kaoru Ichinose

A
Aah, Itoshi no Banchō-sama - Mayu Fujikata
Akagami no Shirayukihime - Akizuki Sorata
Aoiro Toshokan - Mikase Hayashi
Auto Focus - Aya Roppongi

B
Ballad of a Shinigami - Asuka Izumi
Bell - Mikoto Asō

C
Cluster Edge - Wan Komatsuda
Chikyū Kanri-nin - Makoto Mori
Chikyū Kōshinkyoku - Mikase Hayashi

F
Film Girl - Shigeyoshi Takagi

G
Gen'ei Kitan - Shiho Inada
Gensō Kajin - Chiaki Karasawa

H
Hana ni Arashi - Shigeyoshi Takagi
Hana no Namae - Ken Saitou
Hanatsuki-hime - Wataru Hibiki
Harukanaru Toki no Naka de - Tōko Mizuno
Harukanaru Toki no Naka de 5 - Tooko Mizuno
Hiiro no Isu - Yuki Midorikawa
Himitsu no Himegimi Uwasa no Ōji - Mato Kauta
Himegimi no Tsukurikata - Asuka Izumi
Honey - Yutaka Tachibana
Hoshi-yomi no Yogensha - Natsuna Kawase
Hyakujū Kingdom - Shigeyoshi Takagi

I
Ibara no Okite - Yuni Yukimura
IDOLiSH7 Re:member - Tanemura Arina

J
Jun'ai Station - Kei Tanaka
Jūni Hisoku no Palette - Nari Kusakawa

K
Kaichou wa Maid-sama! - Hiro Fujiwara
Kana, Kamo. - Yutaka Tachibana
Katakoi Triangle - Shinobu Amano
Kazoku Gokko - Chiaki Karasawa
Kids Talk - Nozomi Yanahara
Kimi no Umi e Ikō - Fumika Okano
Kimi to Himitsu no Hanazono - Mikase Hayashi
Kingyo-sō - Yuki Fujitsuka
Koto no Ha - Mikoto Asō
Kyōryū na Haisha-san - Masami Morio

L
Lapis Lazul no Ōkan - Natsuna Kawase
Lovely Hyakka Jiten - Fumika Okano

M
Mademoiselle Butterfly - Akane Ogura
Maruichi-teki Fūkei - Nozomi Yanahara
Megane Danshi Shinkasetsu - Kaoru Ichinose
Mekakushi no Kuni - Sakura Tsukuba
Mikado no Shihō - Emiko Nakano
Mikaduki Pan - Asuka Sasada
Mochimochi no Kamisama - Masami Morio
Momoyama Kyōdai - Yuki Fujitsuka
Mujūryoku Aria - An Tsukimiya

N
Neko Love - Rika Yonezawa
Ningyō-shi no Yoru - Yutaka Tachibana
Nobara no Hanayome - Yū Toyota
Nushi-sama Series - Megumi Wakatsuki

O
Onsen de Aimashō - Chiaki Karasawa
Otenki no Miko - Nozomi Yanahara

P
Pajama de Goron - Asuka Sasada
Present wa Shinju - Ken Saitō

R
Rakuen Route - An Tsukimiya

S
Saint Hyper Keibitai – Masami Morio
Shabekuri King – Rika Yonezawa
Shōnen Dolls – Wataru Hibiki
Sugar Family – Akira Hagio
Suits no Kuni no Mahoutsukai – Kaoru Ichinose
 – Sakura Tsukuba

T
Taiyou mo Wasure Sasete - Kaoru Ichinose
Tennen Sozai de Ikō - Mikoto Asō
Teppen! - An Tsukimiya
Tobenai Majo - Natsuna Kawase
Tokage Ōji - Asuka Izumi
Torikae Fūka Den - Nozomi Yanahara
Toshokan Sensō Love&War - Kiiro Yumi
Trouble Dog - Aya Roppongi

U
Uchi no Pochi no Yūkoto niwa - Yutaka Tachibana
Umewaka Torimonochou - Kaoru Ichinose

V
Vamp Series - Yutaka Tachibana
Variety - Asuka Sasada

W
With!! - Ken Saitou

X
Xazsa - Junko Tamura

Y
Yashio to Mikumo - Nari Kusakawa

Z
Zettai Heiwa Daisakusen - Akane Ogura

References

External links
LaLa DX @ Hakusensha.co.jp  

Bi-monthly manga magazines published in Japan
Quarterly manga magazines published in Japan
Magazines established in 1983
Shōjo manga magazines
Hakusensha magazines
Magazines published in Tokyo